In five-dimensional geometry, a runcinated 5-cube is a convex uniform 5-polytope that is a runcination (a 3rd order truncation) of the regular 5-cube.

There are 8 unique degrees of runcinations of the 5-cube, along with permutations of truncations and cantellations. Four are more simply constructed relative to the 5-orthoplex.

Runcinated 5-cube

Alternate names 
 Small prismated penteract (Acronym: span) (Jonathan Bowers)

Coordinates 
The Cartesian coordinates of the vertices of a runcinated 5-cube having edge length 2 are all permutations of:

Images

Runcitruncated 5-cube

Alternate names
 Runcitruncated penteract
 Prismatotruncated penteract (Acronym: pattin) (Jonathan Bowers)

Construction and coordinates
The Cartesian coordinates of the vertices of a runcitruncated 5-cube having edge length 2 are all permutations of:

Images

Runcicantellated 5-cube

Alternate names 
 Runcicantellated penteract
 Prismatorhombated penteract (Acronym: prin) (Jonathan Bowers)

Coordinates 
The Cartesian coordinates of the vertices of a runcicantellated 5-cube having edge length 2 are all permutations of:

Images

Runcicantitruncated 5-cube

Alternate names 
 Runcicantitruncated penteract
 Biruncicantitruncated pentacross
 great prismated penteract (Jonathan Bowers)

Coordinates 
The Cartesian coordinates of the vertices of a runcicantitruncated 5-cube having an edge length of 2 are given by all permutations of coordinates and sign of:

Images

Related polytopes 

These polytopes are a part of a set of 31 uniform polytera generated from the regular 5-cube or 5-orthoplex.

References 
 H.S.M. Coxeter: 
 H.S.M. Coxeter, Regular Polytopes, 3rd Edition, Dover New York, 1973 
 Kaleidoscopes: Selected Writings of H.S.M. Coxeter, edited by F. Arthur Sherk, Peter McMullen, Anthony C. Thompson, Asia Ivic Weiss, Wiley-Interscience Publication, 1995,  
 (Paper 22) H.S.M. Coxeter, Regular and Semi Regular Polytopes I, [Math. Zeit. 46 (1940) 380-407, MR 2,10]
 (Paper 23) H.S.M. Coxeter, Regular and Semi-Regular Polytopes II, [Math. Zeit. 188 (1985) 559-591]
 (Paper 24) H.S.M. Coxeter, Regular and Semi-Regular Polytopes III, [Math. Zeit. 200 (1988) 3-45]
 Norman Johnson Uniform Polytopes, Manuscript (1991)
 N.W. Johnson: The Theory of Uniform Polytopes and Honeycombs, Ph.D. 
  o3x3o3o4x - span, o3x3o3x4x - pattin, o3x3x3o4x - prin, o3x3x3x4x - gippin

External links 
 
 Polytopes of Various Dimensions, Jonathan Bowers
 Runcinated uniform polytera (spid), Jonathan Bowers
 Multi-dimensional Glossary

5-polytopes